Malekabad (also Romanized as Malekābād, Malakābād, and Malikābād) is a village in Malekabad Rural District, in the Central District of Sirjan County, Kerman Province, Iran. At the 2006 census, its population was 1,370, in 336 families.

References 

Populated places in Sirjan County